Johan Rogestedt (born 27 January 1993) is a Swedish male middle distance runner.

He won the gold medal over 800 metres at the 2009 World Youth Championships in Athletics, becoming Sweden's first ever champion in that event.

Rogestedt finished tenth in the 1500 metres at the 2011 European Team Championships Super League in Stockholm.

In 2014 Rogestedt runs a personal best in the 800m on a time of 1.45,89 which is currently the third fastest time in Sweden of all time. At the PDE race in December 2014 Rogestedt started but did not finish.

Competition record

References

External links

 

1993 births
Living people
Swedish male middle-distance runners